Gary Nixon (January 25, 1941 – August 5, 2011) was an American professional motorcycle racer who most notably won the A.M.A. Grand National Championship in 1967 and 1968 as a member of the Triumph factory racing team. He was also the winner of the 1967 Daytona 200 motorcycle race on a 500cc Triumph Daytona.

Nixon was born in Anadarko, Oklahoma. He was known for his partnership with legendary tuner Erv Kanemoto when they won the 1973 U.S. National Road Racing Championship for Kawasaki. He competed at the international level in the 1976 Formula 750 championship, laying claim to the Formula 750 world championship on a modified Kawasaki KR750 until international politics denied him that prize.

He was inducted into the AMA Motorcycle Hall of Fame in 1998 and the Motorsports Hall of Fame of America in 2003.  He last resided in Maryland and participated in vintage motorcycle racing as well as testing motorcycles for the locally produced syndicated public TV automotive review program MotorWeek.

Nixon suffered a heart attack on July 29, 2011 and died in Baltimore, Maryland on August 5 from complications.  He was 70.

References

External links
GaryNixon.com - Official website
Gary Nixon at the AMA Motorcycle Hall of Fame
Gary Nixon at the Motorsports Hall of Fame of America
Nicky Hayden Remembers Nixon: "I'll Miss Him"

1941 births
2011 deaths
People from Anadarko, Oklahoma
Sportspeople from Baltimore County, Maryland
American motorcycle racers
AMA Grand National Championship riders